The 2010–11 season was Dundee's 6th consecutive season in the Scottish First Division after being relegated from the SPL in 2005.

Season summary

Dundee had an average start to the season, but results dramatically improved despite going into administration culminating in the release of their manager Gordon Chisholm, his assistant Billy Dodds, and nine players. As a result of going into administration on 1 November 2010, the Dee were given a 25-point deduction as punishment. After the punishment was imposed, Dundee were left bottom of the First Division table with  -11 points, 20 points behind the second-bottom team. Dundee went on a 23 match undefeated streak avoiding relegating & ending the season in mid table (6th).

Match results

Division summary

Division table

Scottish First Division

Scottish Cup

Scottish League Cup

Scottish Challenge Cup

Squad

Key:
 = Appearances,
 = Goals,
 = Yellow card,
 = Red card

Players with a zero in every column only appeared as unused substitutes

Records

Top goalscorers

Disciplinary record

Transfers

Transfers Summer

Players in

Players out

Transfers Mid Window

Players in

Players out

Transfers Winter

Players in

Players out

See also
 List of Dundee F.C. seasons

References

Dundee
Dundee F.C. seasons